Agostino Ciasca (secular name Pasquale) (born at Polignano a Mare, in the province of Bari, 7 May 1835; died at Rome, 6 February 1902) was an Italian Augustinian and Cardinal. He was a distinguished orientalist, and archivist of the Vatican Secret Archives.

Life
He received the habit of the Order of St. Augustine in 1856, made his religious profession in 1857, and in 1858 was ordained priest. He studied Oriental languages, especially Arabic and Coptic.

Pope Leo XIII entrusted to him several delicate missions. In his order, besides being professor of dogmatic theology, Sacred Scriptures and the Oriental languages, Ciasca also held the positions of prefect of studies, assistant general, and afterwards of procurator general.

In 1866 he obtained the chair of Hebrew in the College of Propaganda, and later took part in the First Vatican Council in the quality of theologian and as interpreter for the Oriental bishops. He also occupied the following positions: consultor of the Congregation of Propaganda for the affairs of Oriental Rites (1872); writer in the Vatican Library for Arabic (1876); pontifical interpreter at the Congregation of Propaganda; ordinary censor of Oriental books and professor of Oriental languages in the Roman Seminary (1878); dean of the faculties of Oriental languages and theology in the same seminary, and president of the college of interpreters at the Propaganda (1882); consultor of the Holy Office (1889).

In 1891 he was created Titular Archbishop of Larissa with the appointment to the office of prefect of the Vatican Archives; in the same year he was sent by the Holy See to preside over the Ruthenian synod at Lemberg. In 1892 he was named pro-secretary of the Congregation of Propaganda (1893). He was elevated to Cardinalate at the secret consistory of 19 June 1899, and given the titular church of San Callisto.

Works

He published (1885–89) the extant fragments of a very ancient Coptic version of the Old Testament, from manuscripts in the Borgia (Propaganda) Museum. He discovered and edited (1888) of an Arabic version of the Diatessaron of Tatian, a text of importance for the history of the Canon of the New Testament (cf. M. Maher, "Recent Evidence for the authenticity of the Gospel: Tatian's Diatessaron", London, 1903).

His own principal works are:

"Examen Critico-Apologeticum super Constitutionem Dogmaticam de Fide Catholica editam in Sessione tertia SS. Oecumenici Concilii Vaticanii", 270 pp. 8vo (Rome, 1872)
"I Papiri Copti del Museo Borgiano della S. C. de Propaganda Fide tradotti e commentati", pamphlet of 55 pp. (Rome, 1881)
"Sacrorum Bibliorum Framenta Copto-Sahidica Musei Borgiani", vol. I, 4to 225 pp., with 8 plates (Rome, 1885 and 1889). These two volumes deal with the Old Testament; vol. III, dealing with the New Testament (509 pp. with 40 plates) was published in 1904 by P.J. Balestri..
"Tatiani Evangeliorum Harmoniae Arabicae nunc primum ex duplici codicae editit et latina translatione donavit. . ." in 4to, 108 pp. (Rome, 1888).

Notes

External links

Catholic Hierarchy page
Biography
 Vatican page

1835 births
1902 deaths
People from Polignano a Mare
Augustinian friars
Italian archivists
20th-century Italian cardinals
Italian orientalists
Cardinals created by Pope Leo XIII